This is an incomplete list of La Trobe University people, including alumni and staff.

Alumni

Academia
Lindsay Falvey - academic

Business

Martyn Dunne - CEO, NZ Customs
Ahmed Fahour - former CEO of National Australia Bank and Australia Post
David Morgan - Westpac CEO; former Treasury official; BHP Director
Scott Pape - The Barefoot Investor
Radek Sali - former CEO of Swisse
Maureen Wheeler - founder of Lonely Planet
Jamila Gordon - former CIO of Quantus

Government

Politicians

In Australia

Jacinta Allan, state politician and minister
Helen Buckingham, state politician
Ben Carrol, state politician; minister of public transport, roads and road safety
Phil Cleary, former federal politician; author; social activist; political and sports commentator; former VFL footballer
Jacinta Collins, Senator for Victoria
Mary Delahunty, state politician; former minister; former ABC TV presenter
Martin Dixon, state politician; opposition frontbencher
Matthew Guy, state politician
Sussan Ley, federal politician
Andrew Robb, federal politician; Parliamentary secretary; former Liberal Treasurer
Tony Sheehan, state politician and Treasurer; deputy opposition leader
Sharman Stone, federal politician; former government minister
Theo Theophanous, state politician and minister
Christian Zahra, former federal politician
Gladys Liu, federal politician

In other countries

Abdirahman Farole - former President of Puntland
Maximus Ongkili - Malaysian Cabinet Minister
Abdul Ghani Othman - former Chief Minister of Johor, Malaysia
Bisera Turkovic - Minister of Foreign Affairs, Bosnia and Herzegovina
Emília Pires - Finance Minister, East Timor
Mahinda Samarasinghe - Sri Lankan cabinet minister of disaster management; MP

Civil servants
Stephen Duckett - former Secretary of Commonwealth Department of Human Services and Health (1994–1996); current President and Chief Executive Officer of Alberta Health Services in Canada
Terry Moran - Head of the Department of Prime Minister and Cabinet; Head of the Federal Public Service
Geoff Raby - Foreign Affairs secretary; Australia's most senior Trade official; World Trade Organization negotiator; Australian ambassador to China
Ian Watt -  Secretary of the Commonwealth Department of Finance; former Treasury and cabinet official; former diplomat
Vinod Kumar Yadav - 1980 batch IRSEE officer and current Chairman of the Indian Railways Board
Mary Amiti - Senior official at the Federal Reserve Bank of New York, formerly IMF and World Bank

Humanities

Arts

Dailan Evans - comedian (current student)
Corinne Grant - TV personality, comedian, actor
Tahan Lew-Fatt - model, TV personality
Pia Miranda - actress
Bob Morley - actor, twice receiver of E! Online's Alpha Male Madness, ex-singer, star on The 100
Rachel Peters - model, beauty queen (Miss Universe Philippines 2017)

History

Journalism and media

Morag Fraser - academic, social commentator, journalist
Jane Gazzo - BBC presenter
Jennifer Keyte - journalist, TV news presenter
Naomi Robson - journalist, presenter
Tim Ross - TV and radio personality, comedian
Omer Kablan - TRT World presenter
Virginia Trioli - ABC presenter, journalist, author, political commentator
Geoff Walsh - former Australian Labor Party National Secretary; United Nations official and delegate; adviser to Prime Ministers Bob Hawke and Paul Keating; Consul General to Hong Kong; Age and Australian Financial Review journalist

Literature, writing and poetry
Paul Jennings - children's author
John Silvester - crime writer; The Age journalist
Don Watson - author, academic, political commentator, former speechwriter for Paul Keating

Philosophy and theology

Law

Medicine and science
Elaine Baker - Marine science and environment researcher; Director of the University of Sydney Marine Studies Institute
Tim Flannery - biologist, author and commentator on global warming; 2007 Australian of the Year
Neil J. Gunther - Australian/American physicist and computer scientist
Geoff Love - Director of the Bureau of Meteorology
Lynne Kelly (science writer) - researcher and science educator

Sport

Catherine Arlove -  Olympian, Judo
Linda Beilharz -  adventurer
Samuel Beltz - Olympian, rowing
Andrew Demetriou - former Australian Football League CEO
Warwick Draper - Olympic kayak competitor
Lachlan Giles -  grappler and Brazilian jiu-jitsu black belt competitor
Brad Green - former Melbourne footballer; current Carlton development coach 
Rachel Imison - Olympian, field hockey
Ahmed Kelly - Paralympian (current student)
Tamsyn Manou - Olympic athlete, world champion
Tim Matthews - Paralympian
Bree Mellberg – Wheelchair basketball player
Angus Monfries - AFL player, Essendon (current student)
Chris Mullins -  Paralympian

Other
Bill Kelty - former Australian Council of Trade Unions secretary; union official; AFL Commissioner
Brian Loughnane - Federal Director of the Liberal Party of Australia

Administration

Chancellors

Vice-Chancellors

Faculty

Current

Politics
Dennis Altman – academic; expert on the politics of gender
Nick Bisley – professor of politics and international relations; frequently contributes to the media and public debates
Judith Brett – academic in the field of politics; author of several books on Australian politics
Joseph Camilleri – academic in the field of international relations and director of the Centre for Dialogue
Robert Manne – academic; public intellectuals; author of books on Australian politics and society

Sociology and anthropology
Peter Beilharz – public intellectual
John Carroll – academic in the field of sociology; public intellectual

Economics and finance
 Don Brash – former Governor of the Reserve Bank of New Zealand; former New Zealand Opposition Leader
 Joanna Poyago-Theotoky - Professor of Economics

Philosophy
Agnes Heller – philosopher
Frank Cameron Jackson –  philosopher

English
David Tacey – literature academic

History
Richard Broome – Aboriginal historian
John Hirst – historian and commentator 
Katie Holmes – historian
Marilyn Lake – social historian
Yves Rees - historian
Quinn Eades - historian

Archaeology
David Frankel – archaeologist, known for work on sites in Cyprus
Peter Mathews – archaeologist, known for work on Mayan hieroglyphs
Tim Murray – archaeologist, Dean of faculty of Humanities and Social Sciences

Cinema and media studies
John Flaus – film academic and actor
Terrie Waddell – film academic and actress

Linguistics
David Bradley – linguist

Science
Michael Clarke – zoologist
Bree Mellberg – biochemistry researcher, Wheelchair basketball player
Roger Parish – botanist
Erinna Lee - biochemistry researcher
Pamela Claire Snow - Educational psychologist and speech pathologist

Past 
 Graeme Clark – key figure in the research and development of the Bionic Ear
Inga Clendinnen
Peter Cochrane – historian and author
Burkhard Dallwitz – composer, Golden Globe winner
Edward Duyker – historian and author
Alan Frost – historian
Petro Georgiou – Federal Liberal MP
Gerard Henderson
Daryl E. Hooper – inaugural professor in engineering
Rhys Isaac – Pulitzer Prize winner
Robert Lovell Reid - professor of Agriculture 1968 to 1979 after whom the R L Reid Building is named
Andrew Robb – current Federal Liberal MP; former Liberal Party treasurer
J. J. C. Smart – philosopher
Elizabeth Essex-Cohen - physicist

Administrative 
 Fran Kelly – journalist, ABC presenter

References

Lists of people by university or college in Australia
University
La Trobe University